Postcards from Paradise is the 18th studio album by Ringo Starr. It was released on 31 March 2015.

Development

The album was produced completely by Starr himself, and engineered by longtime collaborator Bruce Sugar. Several album titles were considered, including "Let Love Lead". Starr worked with many of his regular songwriting and recording colleagues on Postcards from Paradise, including Van Dyke Parks, Dave Stewart, and Gary Burr. As with his previous albums, Starr maintains a philosophy of "If you show up at my house and you can play, you're on the record". The song "Island in the Sun" is notable as being the first studio recording that was co-written and recorded by every member of Starr's current All-Starr Band.

Rock photographer Rob Shanahan took the cover photograph, which was developed further by Universal Music Group, Starr's record label. The label added a grey scalloped border in the manner of a postage stamp.

Promotion and release
Starr first revealed the album's title through a Twitter post in January 2015. Three tracks, "Postcards from Paradise", "Right Side of the Road" and "Not Looking Back", became available for purchase in early March 2015. A lyric video for "Postcards from Paradise" was released on 5 March via Yahoo.com. "Confirmation", "Bamboula" and "Touch and Go" were released during the week preceding the album's release. The album was issued a few weeks before Starr's second induction into the Rock and Roll Hall of Fame.

Track listing

Personnel
Personnel per booklet.

Musicians

 Ringo Starr – lead and backing vocals, drums, percussion, keyboards (3, 4) reggae guitar (5), piano (11) string arrangement
 David A. Stewart – guitar (1, 6)
 Steve Lukather – guitar (8), synth bass (2), backing vocals (2, 8)
 Joe Walsh – guitar (3, 6) 
 Peter Frampton – guitar (5, 11)
 Richard Marx – backing vocals, guitar (6)
 Steve Dudas – guitar (9, 10)
 Gary Nicholson – guitar (11)
 Michael Bradford – bass guitar (1)
 Nathan East – bass guitar (6, 9, 10, 11)
 Richard Page – backing vocals, bass guitar (8)
 Jason Borger – keyboards (1)
 Bruce Sugar – sitar synth (2), keyboards, piano (4), synth (4), synth bass (5), string arrangement, synth strings (6)
 Ann-Marie Simpson – violin, string arrangement
 Van Dyke Parks – piano, accordion, synth (7), horn arrangement
 Lee Thornburg – trombone (7), trumpet & trombone (10)
 Gregg Bissonette – percussion, trumpet, steel drums, backing vocals (8)
 Gregg Rolie – organ (8)
 Warren Ham – saxophone, keyboard, backing vocals (8)
 Jimmy Z – harmonica (9), saxophone (10)
 Glen Ballard – piano (10)
 Benmont Tench – organ (5, 9), piano (6)
 Double Treble – backing vocals (1)
 Amy Keys – backing vocals
 Kari Kimmel – backing vocals
 Todd Rundgren – backing vocals
 Windy Wagner – backing vocals

Production

 Ringo Starr – producer, mixing
 Bruce Sugar – recording, mixing, keyboard programming
 Chris Bellman – mastering
 Ned Douglas – additional engineer
 Sean Rolie – B3 organ engineering
 Vartan – art direction
 Masaki, Meire Murakani – design
 Rob Shanahan – cover photo
 Scott Ritchie – back cover photo

Charts

References

External links

2015 albums
Ringo Starr albums
Albums produced by Ringo Starr
Universal Music Enterprises albums